IDEA: The Law Review of the Franklin Pierce Center for Intellectual Property is a law review published by an independent student organization at the Franklin Pierce Center for Intellectual Property at the University of New Hampshire School of Law.

Overview 
IDEA: The Law Review of the Franklin Pierce Center for Intellectual Property covers scholarly legal articles relating to patent, copyright, trademark, trade secret, unfair competition, technology law, and general intellectual property issues. The Law Review publishes three issues each year.

History 
In June 1957, the Patent, Trademark and Copyright (PTC) Research Foundation at George Washington University published the first issue of IDEA under the name Patent, Trademark and Copyright Journal of Research and Education. In 1973, the Franklin Pierce Law Center, founded by Robert H. Rines, became home to the PTC Research Foundation as well as its student-run Patent, Trademark & Copyright Journal of Research & Education. In 1999, the PTC Research Foundation relocated to the Academy of Applied Science, but the student-run journal remained at the Pierce Law Center.

In 1977, the journal first incorporated the wordmark IDEA into its title. In 2002, the journal changed its name to IDEA: The Intellectual Property Law Review. In 2010, IDEA became a publication of the University of New Hampshire School of Law when the Franklin Pierce Law Center merged with the University of New Hampshire.

Notable articles
  This article was cited by the Court of Appeals for the Federal Circuit in State Street Bank v. Signature Financial Group, 149 F. 3d 1368 (Fed. Cir. 1998).
  This article was cited by the United States Supreme Court in Florida Prepaid Postsecondary Education Expense Board v. College Savings Bank, 527 U.S. 627 (1999).

References

External links

Archives
Volume 61 edition of IDEA (February 2021)

American law journals
Technology law journals
Intellectual property law journals
Publications established in 1957
English-language journals